Ben Coes (born September 10, 1966) is a New York Times best-selling author of international political thriller and espionage novels.

Coes's novels feature Dewey Andreas, a former member of U.S. Special Forces 1st SFOD-D, also known as Delta Force. Coes has called his books "reality-based," drawing upon his early career at the White House and in finance. Coes has credited his godfather, a former member of the U.S. Navy SEALs, with influencing the often violent, brutally realistic plots of his novels.

Early life
Ben Coes was born in Hartford, Connecticut and raised in West Simsbury, Connecticut. He attended the Groton School, a boarding school in Massachusetts which counts Franklin D. Roosevelt among its alumni Coes attended Columbia College in New York City, where he was awarded the university's writing prize, the Bennett Cerf Memorial Award.

Political and business career
Coes started his career as a White House intern under President Ronald Reagan, and then served as the White House-appointed speechwriter for former U.S. Secretary of Energy James D. Watkins under President George H. W. Bush. He also wrote speeches for T. Boone Pickens and was campaign manager for Mitt Romney’s 2002 run for governor of Massachusetts. He is a managing partner at The Mustang Group, a private equity firm, which has invested in a number of companies, including Cascade Lacrosse, Vermont Teddy Bear, Scribe Software, Mr. Youth, CrowdTap, Country Club Enterprises, Net Direct Merchants, and SOG Specialty Knives, and is a former fellow of the Harvard University Institute of Politics.

Books
Power Down, Ben Coes's debut novel, stars Dewey Andreas, who faces terrorists trying to destroy America by attacking its energy resources. His second book, Coup d'État, is a sequel to Power Down. Pakistan drops a nuclear bomb on India, and Dewey must stop the situation from escalating. Coes's third novel, The Last Refuge, features a joint covert U.S.-Israel paramilitary operation to penetrate Iran and stop the country from detonating a nuclear device inside Tel Aviv. The fourth installment in the series, Eye For An Eye, involves a clandestine confrontation between China and the U.S., in which Dewey infiltrates the PRC to take revenge for the death of his fiancée. In Coes's fifth book, Independence Day, Dewey must stop a Russian computer hacker and terrorist from detonating a stolen Soviet-era nuclear bomb in New York City on the 4th of July.  "First Strike", the sixth book in the Dewey Andreas series, involves America's role in the creation of ISIS through an illegal covert arms-for-influence program. When ISIS takes over a dormitory at Columbia University, (Coes' alma mater) Dewey and a small team of operatives must wage an underground assault on the dormitory in order to save the lives of hundreds.

Charitable work
In 2013, Ben and his family started Thrillers for America's Best, a non-profit that sends books to U.S. Veterans at VA homes and hospitals in the U.S. Its first shipment of books was made in August 2013.

Bibliography

Dewey Andreas series 

 "Salina" (short story), February 1, 2016. 
 "Shooting Gallery" (short story), June 5, 2018.

Rob Tacoma series

References

External links

Ben Coes at the Macmillan/St. Martin's Press website
Ben Coes Facebook Fan Page
Ben Coes Instagram Account

21st-century American novelists
American male novelists
Living people
American thriller writers
1966 births
21st-century American male writers
Columbia College (New York) alumni